Gabriel "Gaby" Mudingayi (born 1 October 1981) is a Congolese-Belgian former professional footballer who played as a midfielder.

Career

Early years
Mudingayi moved to Belgium at a young age and started his career at the third division club Union Saint-Gilloise. He spent two seasons with the club before moving to Jupiler League side Gent, aged 19.

Mudingayi established himself in the club's starting XI during the following campaigns, and was selected to represent Belgium at both youth and senior level for the first time.

Move to Italy: Torino and Lazio
In January 2004 Mudingayi joined Italian Serie B side Torino, helping the club win promotion back to Serie A in 2005. However, the club went bankrupt, releasing all the players as free agents. He moved to Lazio in August 2005.

After struggling with injuries, Mudingayi scored his first and only goal for Lazio on 8 January 2006, in a 4–1 win over Ascoli. However, on 22 April, in a 1–1 away draw against Juventus, his leg was broken in a tackle by Fabio Cannavaro.

Mudingayi only became a regular starter in the 2006–07 campaign, under Delio Rossi, appearing in 28 matches.

Bologna
On 21 July 2008, Mudingayi was sold to newly promoted team Bologna for €7 million, on a five-year contract. with part of the transfer receivable of Lazio was converted to the signing of Mourad Meghni outright, for an additional €1.75m.

Mudingayi was an ever-present figure for the rossoblu during his spell, appearing in nearly 30 matches per season.

Internazionale
On 20 July 2012, Internazionale announced that they had signed Mudingayi from Bologna on loan, with an option to purchase. The loan fee was €750,000. Behind Esteban Cambiasso, Walter Gargano and Zdravko Kuzmanović, he only appeared in nine matches during the campaign. Mudingayi also injured his Achilles tendon in January.

In May 2013, after Gargano's departure, Mudingayi was signed permanently by the Nerazzurri for an additional €750,000 fee. on a two-year contract. However, he went on to appear only eight minutes during the whole season, being released in the following year.

Elche
On 20 October 2014, Mudingayi signed a one-year deal with La Liga side Elche CF. However, he could not be registered due to the club's financial troubles, and left on 3 February of the following year.

Cesena
On 11 February 2015, he was signed by Cesena.

Pisa
In October 2016 Mudingayi was signed by Pisa. He was released on 31 January 2017.

References

External links
 
 
 Profile at AIC.Football.it 
 
 

1981 births
Footballers from Kinshasa
Living people
Democratic Republic of the Congo emigrants to Belgium
Belgian footballers
Association football midfielders
Belgian Pro League players
Royale Union Saint-Gilloise players
K.A.A. Gent players
Serie A players
Serie B players
Torino F.C. players
S.S. Lazio players
Bologna F.C. 1909 players
Inter Milan players
Belgian expatriate footballers
Belgian expatriate sportspeople in Italy
Expatriate footballers in Italy
Belgian expatriate sportspeople in Spain
Expatriate footballers in Spain
Belgium international footballers
Belgium under-21 international footballers
Black Belgian sportspeople